Winky's Horse is a 2005 Dutch children's film. It was released in the Netherlands on 12 October 2005 and received a re-release the following year. Winky's Horse received multiple award nominations and wins, and screenwriter Tamara Bos won a Golden Calf award for Best Screenplay of a Feature Film. The film also received a Golden Film for 100,000 visitors.

A sequel, Where Is Winky's Horse?, was released in 2007.

Plot
Winky (Ebbie Tam) and her mother (Hanyi Han) have recently traveled from China to the Netherlands in order to join Winky's father (Aaron Wan). The move is not entirely smooth, as Winky has to learn to speak Dutch while also experiencing some culture shock due to the differences between the two countries. She finds some solace with her neighbors Oom Siem (Jan Decleir) and Tante Cor (Betty Schuurman), as they own an old horse that Winky instantly adores.

However, when her beloved horse dies, Winky is heartbroken and decides that she must have another horse in her life—even if she must appeal to St. Nicholas (also played by Decleir) to accomplish this.

Cast
Ebbie Tam as Winky Wong
Aaron Wan as Vader Winky
Hanyi Han as Moeder Winky
Jan Decleir as Oom Siem & Sinterklaas (St. Nicholas)
Betty Schuurman as Tante Cor
Mamoun Elyounoussi as Samir
Sallie Harmsen as Sofie
Peter Bolhuis as Vader Sofie
Anneke Blok as Juf Sigrid
Nori de Winter as Maaike
Katrien Pijnenborg as Moeder Maaike
Guus Hoogeboom as Broer Maaike
Nils Verkooijen as Nils
Thijs de Vries as Cas
Lorentz Teufer as Joris
Romano as Amerigo

Reception
Variety wrote a positive review but stated "Kidpic 'Winky's Horse reps a delightful girl-meets-horse story, aimed at tiny tots. Despite its charms, this Holland-set Christmastime fable will have a rough ride finding offshore buyers, even if redubbed for export, given its intensely Dutch frame of reference." DVD Verdict was mixed in their review, as they felt that "It's not a magical tale of whimsy and magical whimsical magic, but it is a sweet slice of character drama. Little Ebbie Tam is a sweetheart who is in nearly every scene which gives her plenty to do, but she's up to it. Of course the overwrought dubbing detracts from the effectiveness—a good amount actually—but my, what a smile!"

References

External links

2000s Dutch-language films
Dutch children's films
2005 films
Films about horses
Sinterklaas films
Films set in the Netherlands
Films shot in the Netherlands